The Wisconsin Badgers men's ice hockey statistical leaders are individual statistical leaders of the Wisconsin Badgers men's ice hockey program in various categories, including goals, assists, points, and saves. Within those areas, the lists identify single-game, single-season, and career leaders. The Badgers represent the University of Wisconsin–Madison in the NCAA's Big Ten Conference.

Wisconsin began competing in intercollegiate ice hockey in 1921.  These lists are updated through the end of the 2021–22 season.

Goals

Assists

Points

Saves

References

Lists of college ice hockey statistical leaders by team
Statistical